Aivenia is a genus of fungi in the family Dermateaceae. The genus contain 4 species.

See also 

 List of Dermateaceae genera

References

External links 

 Aivenia at Index Fungorum

Dermateaceae genera